Anatoly Mikhaylovich Akimov (April 6, 1915, Moscow, Russian Empire —  August 10, 1984, Moscow, RSFSR, USSR) is a Soviet football goalkeeper. Honored Master of Sports of the USSR (1940), Honored coach of the RSFSR (1963). Player Team Moscow. Head coach of the Democratic Republic of Vietnam (1958-1960).

In 1931-35 he played handball, was the champion of Moscow, was a member of the Moscow team.

He was awarded the Order of the Badge of Honour (1937).

Wife, a famous Soviet athlete, champion of the USSR, Natalia Petukhova.

He was buried at the Vagankovo Cemetery.

References

External links
Человек-Угорь

1915 births
1984 deaths
Footballers from Moscow
Honoured Masters of Sport of the USSR
Soviet footballers
Soviet Top League players
FC Torpedo Moscow players
FC Dynamo Moscow players
FC Spartak Moscow players
Soviet football managers
Vietnam national football team managers
FC Ararat Yerevan managers
FC Shinnik Yaroslavl managers
Burials at Vagankovo Cemetery
Association football goalkeepers